The 2018 European Mixed Team Judo Championships was held in Yekaterinburg, Russia on 18 July 2018.

Results

Final

Repechage

Top half

Bottom half

References

External links
 
 Contest Sheet

European Mixed Team Judo Championships
European Mixed
European Judo Championships
EU 2018
July 2018 sports events in Russia
Sport in Yekaterinburg
Judo competitions in Russia
International sports competitions hosted by Russia